Pierre Camoletti (born 11 May 1936) is a Swiss sailor. He competed in the Dragon event at the 1960 Summer Olympics.

References

External links
 

1936 births
Living people
Swiss male sailors (sport)
Olympic sailors of Switzerland
Sailors at the 1960 Summer Olympics – Dragon
Sportspeople from Geneva